Activities of Daily Living is a 2022 novel by Lisa Hsiao Chen. Publishers Weekly included it in their list of the top ten books of 2022, regardless of genre.

Plot

Reception 
Activities of Daily Living was generally well received by critics, including starred reviews from Kirkus Reviews and Publishers Weekly.

Kirkus Reviews wrote, "Elegiac and revealing, Chen's debut illuminates the clock in our hearts."

Multiple reviewers comments on the book's structure. Steph Cha, writing for The New York Times Book Review, wrote, "Chen writes with cool, elegant precision, and the book is compelling despite its diffuse structure, and its withholding of the usual pleasures of fiction, like plot and character development." San Francisco Chronicle highlighted on the book "takes chances with the form to strong effect ... In delivering a meditation on human frailty and endurance, Chen shows us how we cling to our chosen work and the hope buried within it ... The whole novel reads like a project coming into existence." Booklist referred to the novel as "[a]mbitiously inquisitive and ingeniously compelling," noting how it "confronts the liminal spaces between identities, languages, expectations, realities."

Publishers Weekly discussed how the book's structure helps craft "an intelligent and deeply empathic portrayal" of the characters,  and "offers careful and illuminating observations on issues of cultural difference, productivity, family, and freedom." They called the book "masterly and memorable" and ultimately included it in their list of the top ten books of 2022, regardless of genre.

Vogue also included the novel in their list of the best books of the year.

Activities of Daily Living was longlisted for the Center for Fiction First Novel Prize, and for the inaugural Carol Shields Prize for Fiction in 2023.

References 

2022 American novels
English-language literature
W. W. Norton & Company books